General elections were held in Montserrat on 2 April 2001. The result was a victory for the New People's Liberation Movement (NLPM), which won seven of the nine seats in the Legislative Council. NLPM leader John Osborne became Chief Minister.

Electoral system
A new electoral system was introduced for the 2001 elections as a result of the volcanic eruptions rendering four of the seven constituencies uninhabitable. The seven single-member constituencies were replaced with one nine-member constituency in which voters could vote for nine candidates.

Campaign
A total of 24 candidates contested the elections. The NLPM and the National Progressive Party both fielded nine candidates, with six independents also running.

Results

References

Elections in Montserrat
Montserrat
2001 in Montserrat
Montserrat
April 2001 events in North America